Joseph LaVerne Grace (January 5, 1914 – September 18, 1969) was an American professional baseball outfielder who played in Major League Baseball (MLB) for the St. Louis Browns and Washington Senators over six seasons between  and .

Born in Gorham, Illinois, Grace entered pro ball in 1935. He joined the Browns in September 1938 after three seasons with the Class A1 Memphis Chicks. After three partial seasons with St. Louis, he spent the entire  campaign with the Browns and batted .309 with 112 hits. Called to World War II military service after that season, he served in the United States Navy from 1942 to 1945. His minor league career continued in the top-level Pacific Coast League in 1953. He briefly managed in the Chicago Cubs' farm system with the 1966 Duluth-Superior Dukes.

In the majors, Grace posted a .283 batting average (442 for 1,561) with 76 doubles, 18 triples, 20 home runs and 172 RBI in 484 games played. 

Grace died in an automobile accident on September 18, 1969, at the age of 55 in Murphysboro, Illinois.

References

External links

1914 births
1969 deaths
Baseball players from Illinois
Major League Baseball outfielders
Minor league baseball managers
Memphis Chickasaws players
People from Jackson County, Illinois
Pittsburgh Pirates scouts
Road incident deaths in Illinois
Sacramento Solons players
St. Louis Browns players
San Diego Padres (minor league) players
San Francisco Seals (baseball) players
Springfield Browns players
Toledo Mud Hens players
Washington Senators (1901–1960) players
United States Navy personnel of World War II